Fabio Brulart de Sillery (25 October 1655, château de Pressigny – 20 November 1714, Paris) was a French churchman, bishop of Avranches and bishop of Soissons.

Great grandson of Henri de Montmorency and godson of Pope Alexander VII to whom he owes his Italian given name, he studied ancient Greek and Hebrew and received the title of doctor aged only 26. Député to the assembly of the clergy in 1685, he became bishop of Avranches in 1689, then of Soissons from 1692 to 1714. A member of the Académie de Soissons, he was elected a member of the Académie des inscriptions in 1701, then of the Académie française in 1705.

Only a few of Fabio Brulart de Sillery's writings survive, including some poems and dissertations, a harangue against James II of England, a catechism, and some other texts published by François Lamy in 1700 with some by Antoine Arnauld and Dominique Bouhours under the title Réflexions sur l'éloquence.

References

External links
 Biography on the Académie française site
Genealogy of the Sillery family

1655 births
1714 deaths
People from Indre-et-Loire
Bishops of Avranches
Bishops of Soissons
Translators from Hebrew
French classical scholars
Members of the Académie Française
Members of the Académie des Inscriptions et Belles-Lettres
French male writers
17th-century French translators